Clare is a provincial electoral district in  Nova Scotia, Canada which existed between 1949-2013 and since 2021. Prior to 1949, Clare was part of Digby district.  It elects one member of the Nova Scotia House of Assembly.  The electoral district includes most of the Municipality of the District of Clare, an Acadian area occupying the southwestern half of Digby County. For four consecutive elections from 1988 to 1999, the district had the highest voter turnout in the province.

The electoral district was abolished following the 2012 electoral boundary review and was largely replaced by the new electoral district of Clare-Digby. It was re-created our of Clare-Digby following the 2019 Electoral Boundary Review.

Geography

Members of the Legislative Assembly
The electoral district was represented by the following Members of the Legislative Assembly:

Election results

1949 general election

1953 general election

1956 general election

1960 general election

1963 general election

1967 general election

1970 general election

1974 general election

1978 general election

1981 general election

1984 general election

1988 general election

1993 general election

1998 general election

1999 general election

2003 general election

2006 general election

2009 general election

2017 general election (transposed)

2021 general election

References

External links
riding profile
June 13, 2006 Nova Scotia Provincial General Election Poll by Poll Results

Former provincial electoral districts of Nova Scotia